Óscar Fernando Torres Becerra (born November 18, 1968) is a Mexican football manager and former player. He was born in Guadalajara. Recently he was the manager of Alebrijes de Oaxaca, team that plays in the Liga de Expansión MX.

During his career as a professional footballer, he played on the teams Toluca, Santos Laguna, Cobras de Ciudad Juárez, Monterrey, Tampico Madero and Real Sociedad de Zacatecas.

On June 3, 2019, Torres was appointed as coach of Mineros de Zacatecas, team that played in Ascenso MX. Zacatecas being his first position as a team coach. He had previously been a coach assistant at C.F. Pachuca and the youth teams of this club. In June 2020, Torres left the position at Mineros de Zacatecas due to administrative changes in the team and Ascenso MX, which was renamed as Liga de Expansión MX.

On July 10, 2020, Torres was appointed as coach of Alebrijes de Oaxaca. On October 1, 2021, Torres resigned from his position in Oaxaca to join the coaching staff of Alajuelense, where he became Albert Rudé's assistant.

References

1968 births
Living people
Mexican footballers
Association football defenders
Deportivo Toluca F.C. players
Santos Laguna footballers
C.F. Cobras de Querétaro players
C.F. Monterrey players
Tampico Madero F.C. footballers
Real Sociedad de Zacatecas footballers
Liga MX players
Ascenso MX players
Mexican football managers
Mineros de Zacatecas managers
Footballers from Guadalajara, Jalisco